Pulaski is an 'L' station on the CTA's Pink Line, located in the North Lawndale neighborhood. Pulaski opened on June 16, 1902, as part of the Douglas Park branch of the Metropolitan West Side Elevated Railroad. It served as the terminus of that line until its 1907 extension to 48th Avenue.

Bus connections
CTA
  53 Pulaski 
  157 Streeterville/Taylor

Notes and references

Notes

References

External links
Pulaski (Douglas Line) Station page
Pulaski Road entrance from Google Maps Street View

CTA Pink Line stations
Railway stations in the United States opened in 1902
North Lawndale, Chicago